Strawberry Shortcake is a cartoon character used in greeting cards published by American Greetings. The line was later expanded to include dolls, posters, and other products featuring the character and an extended cast of friends and pets. In addition, the franchise has spawned television specials, animated television series and films. The franchise is currently owned by the Canadian children's television company WildBrain and American brand management company Iconix Brand Group through the holding company Shortcake IP Holdings LLC.

History
The character of Strawberry Shortcake was originally created by Barbi Sargent, who was then working as a freelance artist for American Greetings. The character first appeared on a Laurel Valentine's Day Greeting card in 1972–1973. At the time, the character was simply called Girl with a Daisy or Strawberry Girl and was depicted holding a daisy while wearing an orange bonnet with a strawberry print on it. Rex Conners, American Greetings' staff art director, knew this card was very popular and determined that this was due to the strawberry motif. He requested Barbi to create four cards with a "strawberryish" outfit for the Mega Test Market. Sargent completed the assignment in early July 1977, sending American Greetings four full-color leader cards depicting the Strawberry Shortcake character in full color ("Leader cards" are used by American Greetings for consumer test purposes). These tests marked the first time that the public saw Strawberry Shortcake in her new design, which received a positive reception.

In the late 1970s, further Strawberry Shortcake concept art was drawn by Muriel Fahrion, an illustrator working in American Greetings' Juvenile & Humorous card department. Fahrion then designed a subsequent 32 characters for Those Characters From Cleveland (American Greetings' toy and licensing design division). Later characters that were added to the line were designed by Cindy Mayer Patton and Janet Jones. Artwork for the series was done by a number of different freelancers, though the majority was painted by artist Frances Kariotakis. Lynn Edwards served as the editor of the line, helping to develop the characters and storyline.

The Strawberry Shortcake line of characters each had their own fruit or dessert-themed name with clothing to match the fruit or dessert-themed name, and they each had a dessert or fruit-named pet. Like the Strawberry Shortcake doll, all the other characters' dolls had hair scented to match their dessert theme. The characters lived and played in a magical world known as Strawberryland.

In 1979, toy manufacturer Kenner Products licensed the character and released the first Strawberry Shortcake doll. At the time, Strawberry Shortcake resembled a typical rag doll, complete with freckles, a mop of red yarn curls, and a bonnet with strawberry print on it.  To reflect this, the toy was a rag doll, designed by Muriel Fahrion and made by Susan Trentel, Fahrion's sister.

During the 1980s, Strawberry Shortcake became popular with young girls throughout the United States. At the time, there were many related products, such as sticker albums, clothing, bedding, a video game by Parker Brothers entitled Strawberry Shortcake Musical Match-Ups for the Atari 2600, etc. Several TV specials were made featuring the characters, one each year between 1980 and 1985, by which time the characters' popularity had waned. Kenner produced no new dolls or toys thereafter.

In May 1983, following a court case, copyrights to Strawberry Shortcake were granted to Barbi Sargent from American Greetings Corporation. Later on, Barbi returned the copyrights to American Greetings so that they could continue with the success of the Strawberry Shortcake franchise.

American Greetings manufactured Strawberry Shortcake Christmas ornaments, which are included in the Clara Johnson Scroggins collection, one of the world's largest ornaments collections.

In 1991, THQ tried reviving the franchise by producing an updated line of Strawberry Shortcake dolls. Strawberry and five of her classic friends each got a makeover with new clothes, hair, and eyes. However, the line saw only modest success and lasted just a year.

In 2002, the franchise was revived again, this time with a revamped look by a different designer. Many strong licensing deals were made. A television series with new home video releases was produced. Soundtracks for the episodes were also released.

Bandai (along with KellyToy) was granted the manufacturing rights of the Strawberry Shortcake dolls and toys. For the first time in almost two decades, new video games were launched, produced by The Game Factory for Nintendo's Game Boy Advance and Nintendo DS. Educational CD-ROMs for the PC were also produced.

In 2006, Playmates Toys picked up the rights to manufacture and sell Strawberry Shortcake figurines. The line they produced was named "A World of Friends". A full-length feature film, Strawberry Shortcake: The Sweet Dreams Movie, premiered in 2006 and was released on DVD in February 2007. Playmates Toys lost the manufacturing rights to Hasbro, which began releasing new Strawberry Shortcake–themed toys beginning in the fall of 2009, after American Greetings rebooted the franchise. Hasbro lost the manufacturing rights to The Bridge Direct in early 2014.

In February 2015, Iconix Brand Group acquired the rights to Strawberry Shortcake from American Greetings for $105 million.

In 2017, DHX Media acquired Iconix's entertainment brands, including Strawberry Shortcake and majority ownership of Peanuts, for $345 million. It was finalized on June 30.

1980s

Characters

1980s toys
 Strawberry Shortcake
 Berry Bake Shoppe
 Snail Cart (with Escargot The Snail)
 Carrousel
 Berry-Shaped Carry Case
 Flitter-Bit the Butterfly
 Garden House (Gazebo)
 Big Berry Trolley
 Berry Merry Worm (Philbert Wormly III)
 Berry Happy Home
 Maple Stirrup and the Oatsmobile
 Blow Kiss Baby Doll

1980s television specials
In the early 1980s, there were six animated television specials produced featuring Strawberry Shortcake and related characters.

The first three specials were produced by Robert L. Rosen and Romeo Muller, who also wrote the specials. The first and third specials were animated by Murakami-Wolf-Swenson and Toei Doga, while the second was animated by Perpetual Motion Pictures in New York. Howard Kaylan and Mark Volman, of The Turtles and Flo & Eddie fame, wrote the music and songs for these specials. Russi Taylor voiced Strawberry Shortcake, Bob Ridgely voiced the Peculiar Purple Pieman, and writer/producer Romeo Muller voiced the narrator, Mr. Sun.

The next three specials were produced by Canadian animation studio Nelvana. Only Russi Taylor and Bob Ridgely reprised their roles from the first three specials; Chris Wiggins assumed the role of Mr. Sun, and other Canadian talent comprised the rest of the voice cast. Frequent Nelvana collaborator John Sebastian, most known for his music for Nelvana's Care Bears series, wrote the songs for two of these three specials.

In the United States, the first two specials (The World of Strawberry Shortcake and Strawberry Shortcake in Big Apple City) were syndicated by LBS Communications. On March 6, 2007, they were released on a single DVD by Allumination FilmWorks; this was later re-released on February 10, 2015 by Paramount Home Media Distribution.

Specials

2003 relaunch

Characters with their pets and home

A major revamping took place at the characters' relaunch. Both Pupcake and Custard now belong to Strawberry Shortcake. In Pupcake's place, a new pet, Shoofly Frog, was introduced as Huckleberry Pie's pet, and Apple Dumplin' was relaunched as Strawberry Shortcake's sister. Also, Strawberryland is now divided into "districts" like Cakewalk, Orange Blossom Acres, Huckleberry Briar and Cookie Corners.

Strawberryland Fillies
The 2003 revival of the franchise introduced fillies to the franchise. Each of the fillies is tied down to a character, with the main filly, Honey Pie Pony, being the only one able to talk and have a pet. However, when Playmates took over the dolls' rights from Bandai, they decided to scrap the existing fillies and introduce new ones, but the removal has not spread beyond the scope of the toy line.

2003 TV series

In 2003, the Strawberry Shortcake franchise was given a huge relaunch by DIC Entertainment, and with it, a direct-to-video/TV series was produced, 19 years after the last special. The series reflected the changes in the direction of the franchise and has the primary focus on being an educational program. 44 episodes were produced, including four 45-minute specials. 20th Century Fox Home Entertainment released the series worldwide on VHS and DVD.

2005 live-action TV series
An Argentine live-action TV series of the franchise was shown on El Nueve in 2005, with Laura Anders as Strawberry Shortcake, Camila Offermann as Angel Cake, Luz Luccarini as Ginger Snap and Alan Ferraro as Huckleberry Pie, produced and directed by Paula Venditti and Jonathan Hofman, with 36 episodes.

Theatrically released feature films

2006 film

In October 2006, the first Strawberry Shortcake film, The Sweet Dreams Movie, was released in select cities by Kidtoon Films. The series villains, the Purple Pieman and Sour Grapes, who were notably absent from the TV series, are re-introduced in the film. However, Sour Grapes is re-introduced as Purple Pieman's sister in materials related to the Sweet Dreams Movie. It was released on DVD on February 6, 2007, and has also been aired on networks and released on DVD and VideoCDs worldwide.

2009/10 relaunch

In June 2008, Hasbro won the license from Playmates, resulting in another relaunch of the series. The extensive relaunch involved numerous large redesigns and a reboot of the franchise's universe. The relaunch began in the Summer of 2009, with the release of a CGI movie, The Sky's the Limit, with Anna Cummer voicing Strawberry Shortcake. A TV series, Strawberry Shortcake's Berry Bitty Adventures, debuted in October 2010, on Discovery Family. 65 episodes were produced.

Merchandise of the relaunch began appearing in mid-2009. In 2016, IDW Publishing began releasing an ongoing Strawberry Shortcake comic series written by Georgia Ball, with art by Amy Mebberson. Both Ball and Mebberson identified as fans of the 1980s series, with Ball drawing inspiration from girls with "doubts and challenges but their friends back them up and support them".

The main characters of the show are Strawberry Shortcake, Lemon Meringue, Orange Blossom, Raspberry Torte, Plum Pudding, and Blueberry Muffin. Cherry Jam, a new character made for the series, is introduced in the second season. Huckleberry Pie was reintroduced in the third season as a recurring character, while Sweet and Sour Grapes (no relation to the villainess character) debuted in Series 4, alongside the return of Apple Dumplin'.

In 2014, the toy-making license for Strawberry Shortcake had passed from Hasbro to a company called The Bridge Direct, makers of Pinkie Cooper and The Jet Set Pets dolls. The product shown appeared to retain the designs of the 2009 Strawberry Shortcake relaunch and included several series of dolls featuring pets, doll furniture, and musical instruments.

2018 web series
In May 2018, DHX Media and its subsidiary, WildBrain, debuted a new 2D animated series of Strawberry Shortcake on YouTube and YouTube TV produced by WildBrain Studios. The series features the return of Raisin Cane and the Purple Pieman to the series.

The cast for that series features Alyson Leigh Rosenfeld as Strawberry Shortcake, Amanda Barker as Orange Blossom, Dylan Jones as the Purple Pieman, Kaylin Lee Clinton as Raisin Cane, and Laurie Hymes as Sour Grapes.

2021 relaunch
In 2016, Iconix Brand Group and DHX Media (now WildBrain) began to develop a new animated series.

The series was scheduled for three seasons, totalling 39 episodes, although no cast, crew, or release date were revealed at the time, and would have used 3D computer animation similar to the 2009 series.

This was later retooled, resulting in a newly refreshed Strawberry Shortcake with a new look and redesigns for the characters. A 2D-animated web series from WildBrain Spark Studios titled Strawberry Shortcake: Berry in the Big City, began airing on YouTube on September 18, 2021, with 40 episodes planned for the first season, with a second already in development. A series of CGI-animated 45-minute specials produced by WildBrain Studios is also currently in development, landing on Netflix in 2023. The series was released on Netflix in April 2022. It premiered on Tiny Pop in the United Kingdom on March 7 the same year.

The central cast of this incarnation features Strawberry Shortcake, Custard, Orange Blossom, Lemon Meringue, Blueberry Muffin, and returning character Lime Chiffon.

Media

Soundtracks

Kid Stuff Records released albums based on the character in the early 1980s. After the 2003 revival, Koch Records has issued soundtrack CDs containing music from the TV series and DVDs, as well as one for the movie. Additionally, a CD was released along with a piano book.

Video games

The first Strawberry Shortcake video game was produced in 1983 for the Atari 2600. No further games based upon the franchise were produced until 20 years later, in 2003, with Strawberry Shortcake: Amazing Cookie Party for PC. Since then, games have been published for the Game Boy Advance, Sony PlayStation 2, Nintendo DS, PC, and Mac. A standalone plug-and-play game based on Konami's Dance Dance Revolution franchise was also produced. In addition, mobile apps for the iOS and Android platforms have been released.

Controversy

Penny Arcade
In 2003, the webcomic Penny Arcade posted an "advertisement" for an imaginary computer game, American McGee's Strawberry Shortcake—a parody of the actual computer game American McGee's Alice, a twisted and violent take on Lewis Carroll's works. American Greetings took offense to the parody and issued a cease-and-desist letter, to which the authors begrudgingly complied - but not without making their indignation very clear. A follow-up strip cites bad timing as a contributing factor to the situation. Holkins and Krahulik were not aware that American Greetings was about to relaunch the Strawberry Shortcake line at that time.

Some argue that Penny Arcades case was not covered under the fair use doctrine because the use of the characters, in this case, was for satire; they claim that fair use only protects the unauthorized use of copyrighted characters in parodies of the original material, and that satire and parody are totally different concepts. Others, however, take the view that parody and satire are equally protected by law. Penny Arcade did not intend to offend American Greetings in the comic, but instead American McGee and McFarlane Toys, who collaborated to create a toy line based on a twisted version of The Wonderful Wizard of Oz. The poster also mocked American McGee's game, American McGee's Alice, a game with a dark and twisted take on Lewis Carroll's books, Alice In Wonderland and Through the Looking Glass.

Various animated television shows, including Futurama (episode "Saturday Morning Fun Pit"), Drawn Together, Robot Chicken, The Fairly OddParents, ("Channel Chasers"), and South Park ("Imaginationland Episode II") have since also parodied or satirized Strawberry Shortcake in various ways.

Cookie Jar's lawsuit
In 2008, Cookie Jar Entertainment announced its intention to merge with DiC Entertainment, who holds the rights to the Strawberry Shortcake animated series. The merger was completed on July 23. On the same day as the finalization of the merger, Cookie Jar Entertainment announced further intentions to acquire the Strawberry Shortcake and Care Bears franchises from American Greetings itself. The deal was expected to finalize on September 30, but up until April 2009, there was no further word on the status of the acquisition.

Cookie Jar delayed the acquisition that December due to difficulty in financing it. It was also revealed that Cookie Jar offered US$195 million for the franchise. Due to the situation, American Greetings put the franchise back on sale. French company MoonScoop expressed interest and offered US$95 million for the franchise, US$100 million less than what was offered by Cookie Jar. Cookie Jar competed against MoonScoop's bid and it had until the end of April 2009 to counter MoonScoop's bid.

This led to various lawsuits between Cookie Jar, American Greetings and MoonScoop. American Greetings emerged as the victor of the case and retained ownership of the brands. Iconix Group later bought Strawberry Shortcake brand from American Greetings in February 2015 for US$105 million, 10 million more than that was offered by Moonscoop.

Notes

References

External links
 
 Strawberry Shortcake at Don Markstein's Toonopedia (Archived from the original on December 7, 2017).
 Strawberry Shortcake Revival in 2009 at AnimationInsider.net

 
Doll brands
1980s toys
1990s toys
2000s toys
2010s toys
Toy mascots
Star Comics titles
Comics based on toys
Fashion dolls
Mascots introduced in 1979
1985 comics debuts
Comics characters introduced in 1985
Female characters in animation
Female characters in television
Female characters in advertising
Child characters in animation
Child characters in television
Child characters in advertising
Iconix Brand Group
Strawberries
Television controversies in Canada
Television controversies in the United States